Once Upon a Time in Triad Society (旺角揸Fit人) is a 1996 Hong Kong action film produced and directed by Cha Chuen-yee. The film is a spin-off of the Young and Dangerous film series, focusing on the character of Ugly Kwan, played by Francis Ng.

Cast and roles
 Francis Ng as Brother Kwan
 Loletta Lee as Restaurant / Cart Noodle
 Allen Ting as Lam Fung
 Edmond So as So Wai
 Farini Cheung as Tailor's Daughter
 Pauline Chan as Nurse
 Lam Sheung Yee as Brother Sheung-yee / Kwan's father
 Michael Chan as Brother Lone
 Jamie Luk as Officer Lam
 Jeffrey Lam as Triad boss
 Danny Ko
 Lam Kee-to as Newspaper editor
 Winnie Wong
 Sze Lau-wa as Kwan's lawyer
 Ringo Chan as Yakuza boss
 Samuel Leung as Brother Andy
 Ho Pak-kwong as Tailor
 Jimmy Wong
 Pan Chang-jiang 	
 Airi Ando
 Chan kam-pui as Giant
 Chan Hing-hang as Traid boss
 Simon Cheung as Policeman
 Bobby Yip as Loan shark Wong
 Ridley Tsui as Comic book hero
 Tanigaki Kenji as Japanese thug
 So Wai-nam as Kwan's thug
 Lam Kwok-kit as One of Kwan's hired killers
 Anthony Carpio as One of Kwan's hired killers
 Ding Ning

External links 
 

1996 films
1990s action films
Hong Kong action films
Triad films
1990s Cantonese-language films
Young and Dangerous
Film spin-offs
Hong Kong films about revenge
Films set in Hong Kong
Films shot in Hong Kong
Films set in Tokyo
Films shot in Tokyo
1990s Hong Kong films